Au-delà des lois humaines is a 1920 French silent film directed by Marcel Dumont and Gaston Roudès. The film was based on a novel by Daniel Jourda.

Cast
Rachel Devirys   
Germaine Sablon   
Georges Saillard   
Maurice Schutz   
Jean Signoret   
Nyota Nyoka   
Paul Robert

External links 
 

1920 films
French black-and-white films
French silent films
French drama films
1920 drama films
Silent drama films
1920s French films